Martin Moloney (born 19 October 1999) is an Irish rugby union player, currently playing for United Rugby Championship and European Rugby Champions Cup side Leinster. His preferred position is flanker.

Leinster
Moloney was a member of the under-20s squad for the 2019 Six Nations Under 20s Championship, and started in all five matches, which saw Ireland secure a grand slam victory for the first time since 2007. Subsequently he was named in the Leinster academy for the 2019-20 season. In April 2021, he made his Leinster debut in Round 11 of the Pro14 Rainbow Cup against . In February 2022, he got his first start against  in the United Rugby Championship.

References

External links
itsrugby.co.uk Profile

1999 births
Living people
Irish rugby union players
Leinster Rugby players
Rugby union flankers
People from Athy
Rugby union players from County Kildare